Romanin is a surname. Notable people with this surname include:

Fides Romanin, Italian cross country skier
Samuele Romanin,  Italian historian
, Soviet politician and Communist Party functionary
 (1847-1928), Italian politician

See also
 Romanin was a pseudonym of Jean Moulin
, a  river in France